Icon is the fourth studio album by British heavy metal band Paradise Lost, released in 1993. It marked a departure from the death-doom sound of their early work, and was the last album to feature Matthew Archer on drums.

In February 2018, Icon was inducted into the Decibel Magazine Hall of Fame, becoming the second Paradise Lost album to be featured in the Decibel Hall of Fame (alongside Gothic), with the magazine naming it influential to the development of the gothic metal subgenre.

Style
In 2008, speaking to Kerrang! about the album's music, Nick Holmes remembered:

Track listing
All songs written by Nick Holmes and Gregor Mackintosh.

Personnel
 Nick Holmes – vocals
 Matthew Archer – drums
 Stephen Edmondson – bass
 Aaron Aedy – guitars
 Gregor Mackintosh – guitars

Guest musicians
 Denise Bernard – female vocals
 Andrew Holdsworth – keyboards

Production
 Matt Anker – photography
 Geoff Pesche – mastering
 Pete Coleman – mixing
 Simon Efemey – producer mixing

Charts

References

Paradise Lost (band) albums
1993 albums
Music for Nations albums